The Keystone Steamer was an American automobile manufactured from 1899 until 1900 in Lebanon, Pennsylvania.

History 
Keystone Match & Machine Company was founded in 1894 and offering bicycles from 1896. In 1899 the company offered an interesting but complicated steam car. It featured runabout coachwork and was powered by three small single-cylinder steam engines built into each of its rear wheel hubs in a way that they worked as a radial engine. It was tried to avoid the use of sprockets, chains and a differential gear as each wheel worked completely independent from the other.

Planned production included trucks, but the Keystone Match & Machine Co. gave up all automobile projects in 1900, concentrating instead in producing matches and machinery for that purpose.

Engineer J. G. Xander, who mainly developed the Keystone Steamer, went to Reading, Pennsylvania where he manufactured steam and gasoline engines, and offered for a short time the Xander automobile, built on custom order.

References

Defunct motor vehicle manufacturers of the United States
Motor vehicle manufacturers based in Pennsylvania
Companies based in Lebanon County, Pennsylvania
Lebanon, Pennsylvania
American companies established in 1894
Vehicle manufacturing companies established in 1894
1899 establishments in Pennsylvania
Vehicles introduced in 1899

Veteran vehicles
1890s cars
1900s cars
Highwheeler